Wilhelm Kaufmann (25 May 1895 – 14 February 1975) was an Austrian painter. His work was part of the painting event in the art competition at the 1948 Summer Olympics.

References

1895 births
1975 deaths
20th-century Austrian painters
Austrian male painters
Olympic competitors in art competitions
Artists from Vienna
20th-century Austrian male artists